Land Act (with its variations) is a stock short title used in New Zealand, South Africa, the United Kingdom and the United States for legislation relating to land.

List

New Zealand
The Land Act 1877 (41 Vict No 29)
The Land Act 1877 Amendment Act 1879 (43 Vict No 21) 
The Land Act 1877 Amendment Act 1882 (46 Vict No 46) 
The Land Act 1877 Amendment Act 1884 (48 Vict No 34) 
The Land Act 1885 (49 Vict No 56)
The Land Act Amendment Act 1887 (51 Vict No 32)
The Land Acts Amendment Act 1888 (52 Vict No 17)
The Land Act 1892
The Land Act Amendment Act 1893
The Land Act Amendment Act 1895 (59 Vict No 58) 
The Land Act 1924 (15 Geo 5 No 31) 
The Land Act 1948 (No 64)
The Land Amendment Act 1950 (No 96) 
The Land Amendment Act 1951 (No 60) 
The Land Amendment Act 1952 (No 46) 
The Land Amendment Act 1953 (No 67) 
The Land Amendment Act 1954 (No 37) 
The Land Amendment Act 1956 (No 42) 
The Land Amendment Act 1958 (No 72) 
The Land Amendment Act 1959 (No 70) 
The Land Amendment Act 1960 (No 68) 
The Land Amendment Act 1961 (No 86) 
The Land Amendment Act 1962 (No 78) 
The Land Amendment Act 1963 (No 93) 
The Land Amendment Act 1964 (No 94) 
The Land Amendment Act 1965 (No 48) 
The Land Amendment Act 1967 (No 86) 
The Land Amendment Act 1968 (No 50) 
The Land Amendment Act 1970 (No 122) 
The Land Amendment Act 1971 (No 105) 
The Land Amendment Act 1972 (No 73) 
The Land Amendment Act 1974 (No 92) 
The Land Amendment Act 1975 (No 82) 
The Land Amendment Act 1977 (No 51) 
The Land Amendment Act 1979 (No 57) 
The Land Amendment Act 1981 (No 44) 
The Land Amendment Act 1982 (No 183) 
The Land Amendment Act 1984 (No 11) 
The Land Amendment Act 1998 (No 66)
The Land Laws Amendment Act 1907 (7 Edw 7 No 51) 
The Land Laws Amendment Act 1912 (3 Geo 5 No 31) 
The Land Laws Amendment Act 1913 (4 Geo 5 No 24)
The Land Laws Amendment Act 1914 (5 Geo 5 No 51) 
The Land Laws Amendment Act 1915 (6 Geo 5 No 75) 
The Land Laws Amendment Act 1917 (8 Geo 5 No 27) 
The Land Laws Amendment Act 1918 (9 Geo 5 No 21) 
The Land Laws Amendment Act 1919 (10 Geo 5 No 39) 
The Land Laws Amendment Act 1920 (11 Geo 5 No 43) 
The Land Laws Amendment Act 1921 (12 Geo 5 No 61) 
The Land Laws Amendment Act 1922 (13 Geo 5 No 29) 
The Land Laws Amendment Act 1925 (16 Geo 5 No 50) 
The Land Laws Amendment Act 1926 (17 Geo 5 No 49) 
The Land Laws Amendment Act 1927 (18 Geo 5 No 33) 
The Land Laws Amendment Act 1928 (19 Geo 5 No 37) 
The Land Laws Amendment Act 1929 (20 Geo 5 No 8) 
The Land Laws Amendment Act 1930 (21 Geo 5 No 35) 
The Land Laws Amendment Act 1931 (21 Geo 5 No 40) 
The Land Laws Amendment Act 1932 (23 Geo 5 No 9) 
The Land Laws Amendment Act 1935 (26 Geo 5 No 25) 
The Land Laws Amendment Act 1939 (3 Geo 6 No 35) 
The Land Laws Amendment Act 1944 (8 Geo 6 No 34) 
The Land Laws Amendment Act 1947 (11 Geo 6 No 64)
The Native Land Act 1873 (37 Vict No 56)
The Settled Land Act 1886 (50 Vict No 27)

South Africa
Natives' Land Act (1913)

United Kingdom
The Settled Land Acts
The Land Registration Act 2002

The "Land Law (Ireland) Acts" is the collective title of the following Acts:
The Landlord and Tenant (Ireland) Act 1870 (33 & 34 Vict c 46) (except Parts II and III)
The Land Law (Ireland) Act 1881 (44 & 45 Vict c 49) (except Part V)
The Land Law (Ireland) Act 1887 (50 & 51 Vict c 33) (except Part II)
The Land Law (Ireland) Act 1888 (51 & 52 Vict c 13)
The Timber (Ireland) Act 1888 (51 & 52 Vict c 37)
The Land Law (Ireland) Act 1888 Amendment Act 1889 (52 & 53 Vict c 59)
The Redemption of Rent (Ireland) Act 1891 (54 & 55 Vict c 57)
The Land Commissioners' Salaries Act 1892 (55 & 56 Vict c 45)

The Landed Property Improvement (Ireland) Acts is the collective title of the following Acts:
The Landed Property Improvement (Ireland) Act 1847 (10 & 11 Vict c 32)
The Landed Property Improvement (Ireland) Act 1849 (12 & 13 Vict c 59)
The Landed Property Improvement (Ireland) Act 1852 (15 & 16 Vict c 34)
The Landed Property Improvement (Ireland) Act 1860 (23 & 24 Vict c 153)
The Landed Property Improvement (Ireland) Act 1862 (25 & 26 Vict c 29)
The Landed Property Improvement (Ireland) Act 1866 (29 & 30 Vict c 26)
The Drainage and Improvement of Land (Ireland) Act 1866 (29 & 30 Vict c 40)

United States
Harrison Land Act (1800)
Land Act of 1804
Land Act of 1820

See also
List of short titles

References

Lists of legislation by short title